The Best of the Vanguard Years or similar may refer to:

The Best of the Vanguard Years (John Fahey album), 1999
The Best of the Vanguard Years (Odetta album), 1999
The Best of the Vanguard Years (Buffy Sainte-Marie album)
 Best of the Vanguard Years (Alison Brown album), 2002
 Best of the Vanguard Years (Ramblin' Jack Elliott album), 2000
 The Vanguard Years (Doc Watson album), 1995